Gregory James McMackin (April 24, 1945 – February 14, 2023) was an American football coach and player. He served as the head football coach at Oregon Institute of Technology from 1986 to 1989 and at the University of Hawaii at Manoa from 2008 to 2011, compiling a career college football record of 53–39–1.  Before coming to Hawaii as defensive coordinator in 2007, he previously served in the same capacity for the Seattle Seahawks, the Miami Hurricanes, and the Texas Tech Red Raiders.

Career
McMackin coached extensively at both the collegiate and professional levels.

At the professional level, McMackin coached for two National Football League teams: as defensive coordinator for the Seattle Seahawks from 1995 to 1998, and as linebackers and assistant head coach for the San Francisco 49ers from 2003 to 2005. He also coached for the Denver Gold of the defunct United States Football League (USFL).

At the college level, McMackin gained prominence as the defense coordinator for the University of Miami for the 1993 and 1994 seasons. There, Miami won two Big East Championships and ranked first in total defense, scoring defense and pass defense.  Further, the Hurricanes allowed just seven touchdowns on defense in one season.  While there, he coached Lombardi Award winner Warren Sapp, Ray Lewis and six First-Team Consensus All-Americans.  The Hurricanes played in the national championship game (Orange Bowl) in 1995.

McMackin served as defensive coordinator at six colleges: Hawaii, Texas Tech, Miami, Navy, Utah, and Idaho.

Briefly, during the first half of the 2007 spring semester, McMackin was an instructor at Texas Tech.

McMackin, previously the defensive coordinator for the Hawaii Warriors, was one of several individuals being considered to fill the vacancy left by June Jones as head coach. Jones left the Hawaii Warriors in January to become the head coach of SMU.

On January 15, 2008, McMackin took over the position of head coach for the Hawaii Warriors.  Upon signing his five-year contract, McMackin became the highest-paid state employee with a $1.12 million annual salary.  The previous record was held by his predecessor, June Jones, with an $800,016 annual salary.

On August 1, 2009 McMackin was suspended for 30 days without pay due to his use of a homophobic slur during an interview.

McMackin resigned from his position of head coach for Hawaii on December 5, 2011, accepting a $600,000 buyout.

Personal life and death
McMackin died on February 14, 2023, at the age of 77.

Accomplishments
 Was Head Coach at Division II Oregon Tech from 1986–89.  Led team to #3 ranking and 4 winning seasons on way to 2 coach of the year awards.
 In 1999, led the University of Hawaii's defense to help orchestrate the biggest single-season turnaround in NCAA football history
 Named one of the nation's top coaches by American Football Magazine while at Texas Tech.
 Named Big 12 Conference's top recruiter by Rivals.com
 As the defensive coordinator for the Seattle Seahawks, coached seven All-Pro selections, and established a franchise-record for seven interceptions in one game.  Overall, Seattle's defense improved from 30th to 8th.
 As defensive coordinator for the University of Miami, McMackin's defense was ranked first in the nation in total defense, scoring defense and pass defense.
 Both of Hawaii's WAC championships during former coach June Jones' tenure at Hawaii came during both of McMackin's two years as defensive coordinator for Hawaii.
 Authored Coaching the Defensive Backfield in 1992, which is in its seventh printing.
 In 2008, McMackin became the highest paid State of Hawaii employee ($1.1 million) upon becoming the Hawaii Warriors football head coach.
 Inducted in the Southern Oregon University Athletic Hall of Fame.

Notable players coached
 Ray Lewis, Miami
 Warren Sapp, Miami
 Dwayne Johnson aka The Rock, Miami
 Rohan Marley, Miami
 Gill Byrd, San Jose State
 Michael Sinclair, Seattle Seahawks
 Jeff Ulbrich, Hawaii and San Francisco 49ers
 Julian Peterson, Detroit Lions
Cortez Kennedy, Seattle Seahawks
Chad Brown, Seattle Seahawks

Head coaching record

College

References

External links
 Hawaii profile

1945 births
2023 deaths
American football defensive backs
Hawaii Rainbow Warriors football coaches
Idaho Vandals football coaches
Miami Hurricanes football coaches
Navy Midshipmen football coaches
Oregon Tech Hustlin' Owls football coaches
San Francisco 49ers coaches
San Jose State Spartans football coaches
Seattle Seahawks coaches
Southern Oregon Raiders football players
Stanford Cardinal football coaches
Texas Tech Red Raiders football coaches
Utah Utes football coaches
United States Football League coaches
High school football coaches in Oregon
People from Springfield, Oregon
Western Oregon Wolves football coaches
National Football League defensive coordinators